Hatun Qillqa (Quechua hatun big, qillqa graphic sign, writing (the act and art of writing), Hispanicized spelling Jatunquilca) is a mountain in the Wansu mountain range in the Andes of Peru, about  high. It is situated in the Apurímac Region, Antabamba Province, Antabamba District. Hatun Qillqa lies southeast of Qillqa, southwest of  Sisiwa and Yuraq Urqu (Quechua for "white mountain", Hispanicized Yuraj Orjo) and northwest of Wank'ayuq Saywa.

References 

Mountains of Peru
Mountains of Apurímac Region